This is a list of butterflies of Japan. About 327 species are known from Japan.

Japan is home to a nine forest ecoregions, which reflect its climate and geography. The islands that constitute Japan generally have a humid climate, which ranges from warm subtropical in the southern islands to cool temperate on the northern island of Hokkaidō.

Japan lies at the convergence of three terrestrial realms, the Palearctic, Indomalaya, and Oceania, and its flora and fauna combine elements from all three. The ecoregions that cover the main islands of Japan, Honshū, Hokkaidō, Kyūshū, and Shikoku, along with the nearby islands, are considered part of the Palearctic realm. The island arcs of southern Japan, the Ryukyu Islands to the southwest and the Ogasawara Islands to the southeast, are home to subtropical moist broadleaf forest ecoregions; the Nansei Islands subtropical evergreen forests ecoregion is part of the Indomalayan realm, while the Ogasawara subtropical moist forests of the Ogasawaras is part of the Oceanian realm.

The terrestrial ecoregions are: 
Temperate broadleaf and mixed forests: Hokkaidō deciduous forests, Nihonkai evergreen forests, Nihonkai montane deciduous forests, Taiheiyo evergreen forests, Taiheiyo montane deciduous forests
Temperate coniferous forests: Hokkaidō montane conifer forests, Honshū alpine conifer forests
Tropical and subtropical moist broadleaf forests: Nansei Islands subtropical evergreen forests, Ogasawara subtropical moist forests.

The most important and threatened butterfly habitat in Japan is Satoyama a Japanese term applied to the border zone or area between mountain foothills and arable flat land.

Hesperiidae
Aeromachus inachus inachus (Ménétriès, 1858)
Badamia exclamationis (Fabricius, 1775)
Borbo cinnara (Wallace, 1866)
Burara aquilina aquilina (Speyer, 1879)
Caltoris cahira (Moore, 1877)
Carterocephalus palaemon akaishianus Fujioka, 1970
Carterocephalus palaemon satakei (Matsumura, 1919)
Carterocephalus silvicola (Meigen, 1830)
Choaspes benjaminii japonicus (Murray, 1875)
Daimio tethys tethys (Ménétriès, 1857)
Erionota torus Evans, 1941
Erynnis montana montana (Bremer, 1861)
Hasora badra badra (Moore, [1858])
Hasora chromus inermis Elwes & Edwards, 1897
Hasora taminata vairacana Fruhstorfer, 1911
Hesperia florinda florinda (Butler, 1878)
Isoteinon lamprospilus lamprospilus C. Felder & R. Felder, 1862
Leptalina unicolor (Bremer & Grey, 1852)
Notocrypta curvifascia curvifascia (C. Felder & R. Felder, 1862)
Ochlodes ochracea (Bremer, 1861)
Ochlodes subhyalinus asahinai Shirôzu, 1964
Ochlodes venatus venatus (Bremer & Grey, 1852)
Parnara bada bada (Moore, 1878)
Parnara guttata guttata (Bremer & Grey, 1852)
Parnara ogasawarensis Matsumura, 1906
Pelopidas agna agna (Moore, [1866])
Pelopidas jansonis (Butler, 1878)
Pelopidas mathias oberthuri Evans, 1937
Polytremis pellucida pellucida (Murray, 1875)
Potanthus flavus flavus (Murray, 1875)
Pyrgus maculatus maculatus (Bremer & Grey, 1852)
Pyrgus malvae unomasahiroi Fujioka, 1994
Suastus gremius (Fabricius, 1798)
Tagiades trebellius martinus Plötz, 1884
Telicota colon hayashikeii Tsukiyama, Chiba & Fujioka, 1997
Thoressa varia (Murray, 1875)
Thymelicus leonina hamadakohi Fujioka, 1993
Thymelicus leonina leonina (Butler, 1878)
Thymelicus lineola lineola (Ochsenheimer, 1808)
Thymelicus sylvatica nishimurai Hamada & Fujioka, 1997
Thymelicus sylvatica sylvatica (Bremer, 1861)
Udaspes folus (Cramer, [1775])

Papilionidae
Atrophaneura alcinous alcinous (Klug, 1836)
Atrophaneura alcinous bradana (Fruhstorfer, 1908)
Atrophaneura alcinous loochooana (Rothschild, 1896)
Atrophaneura alcinous miyakoensis (Omoto, 1960)
Atrophaneura alcinous yakushimana (Esaki & Umeno, 1929)
Graphium agamemnon (Linnaeus, 1758)
Graphium cloanthus kuge (Fruhstorfer, 1908)
Graphium doson albidum (Wileman, 1903)
Graphium doson perillus (Fruhstorfer, 1908)
Graphium mullah (Alpheraky, 1897)
Graphium sarpedon nipponum (Fruhstorfer, 1903)
Luehdorfia japonica Leech, 1889
Luehdorfia puziloi inexpecta Sheljuzhko, 1913
Luehdorfia puziloi yessoensis Rothschild, 1918
Pachliopta aristolochiae interposita (Fruhstorfer, 1904)
Papilio alphenor Cramer, [1776]
Papilio bianor okinawensis Fruhstorfer, 1898
Papilio castor Westwood, 1842
Papilio dehaanii dehaanii C. Felder & R. Felder, 1864
Papilio dehaanii hachijonis Matsumura, 1919
Papilio dehaanii tokaraensis Fujioka, 1975
Papilio demoleus demoleus Linnaeus, 1758
Papilio helenus nicconicolens Butler, 1881
Papilio maackii Ménétriès, 1858
Papilio machaon hippocrates C. Felder & R. Felder, 1864
Papilio macilentus macilentus Janson, 1877
Papilio memnon thunbergii von Siebold, 1824
Papilio paris nakaharai Shirôzu, 1960
Papilio polytes polytes Linnaeus, 1758
Papilio protenor demetrius Stoll, [1782]
Papilio protenor liukiuensis Fruhstorfer, [1899]
Papilio rumanzovius Eschscholtz, 1821
Papilio ryukyuensis amamiensis (Fujioka, 1981)
Papilio ryukyuensis ryukyuensis Fujioka, 1975
Papilio xuthus Linnaeus, 1767
Parnassius citrinarius citrinarius Motschulsky, 1866
Parnassius eversmanni daisetsuzanus Matsumura, 1926
Parnassius stubbendorfii hoenei Schweitzer, 1912
Parnassius stubbendorfii tateyamai Fujioka, 1997
Sericinus montela Gray, 1853
Troides aeacus kaguya (Nakahara & Esaki, 1930)
Troides helena helena (Linnaeus, 1758)

Pieridae
Anthocharis cardamines hayashii Fujioka, 1970
Anthocharis cardamines isshikii Matsumura, 1925
Anthocharis scolymus scolymus Butler, 1866
Aporia crataegi adherbal Fruhstorfer, 1910
Aporia hippia japonica Matsumura, 1919
Appias albina semperi (Moore, [1905])
Appias indra aristoxemus Fruhstorfer, 1908
Appias libythea (Fabricius, 1775)
Appias lyncida formosana (Wallace, 1866)
Appias maria kabiraensis Murayama, 1970
Appias nero domitia (C. Felder & R. Felder, 1862)
Appias panda nathalia (C. Felder & R. Felder, 1862)
Appias paulina minato (Fruhstorfer, [1899])
Catopsilia pomona pomona (Fabricius, 1775)
Catopsilia pyranthe pyranthe (Linnaeus, 1758)
Catopsilia scylla (Linnaeus, 1763)
Colias erate poliographa Motschulsky, [1861]
Colias fieldii chinensis Verity, 1909
Colias palaeno aias Fruhstorfer, 1903
Colias palaeno sugitanii Esaki, 1929
Eurema blanda arsakia (Fruhstorfer, [1910])
Eurema brigitta hainana (Moore, 1878)
Eurema hecabe hecabe (Linnaeus, 1758)
Eurema laeta betheseba (Janson, 1878)
Eurema mandarina mandarina (de l'Orza, 1869)
Gonepteryx amintha formosana (Fruhstorfer, 1908)
Gonepteryx aspasia niphonica Verity, 1909
Gonepteryx maxima maxima Butler, 1885
Hebomoia glaucippe liukiuensis Fruhstorfer, 1898
Ixias pyrene insignis Butler, 1879
Leptidea amurensis amurensis (Ménétriès, 1858) Detail
Leptidea amurensis vibilia (Janson, 1878)
Leptidea morsei morsei (Fenton, [1882])
Leptosia nina niobe (Wallace, 1866)
Pieris brassicae brassicae (Linnaeus, 1758)
Pieris canidia canidia (Sparrman, 1768)
Pieris canidia kaolicola Bryk, 1946
Pieris tomariana Matsumura, 1928
Pieris melete Ménétriès, 1857
Pieris nesis japonica Shirôzu, 1952
Pieris nesis nesis Fruhstorfer, 1909
Pieris rapae crucivora Boisduval, 1836
Pontia edusa davendra Hemming, 1934
Talbotia naganum karumii (Ikeda, 1937)

Lycaenidae
Acytolepis puspa ishigakiana (Matsumura, 1929)
Albulina optilete daisetsuzana (Matsumura, 1926)
Antigius attilia attilia (Bremer, 1861)
Antigius attilia yamanakashoji Fujioka, 1993
Antigius butleri butleri(Fenton, [1882])
Antigius butleri kurinodakensis Fujioka, 1975
Araragi enthea enthea (Janson, 1877)
Arhopala bazalus turbata (Butler, [1882])
Arhopala ganesa loomisi (H. Pryer, 1886)
Arhopala japonica (Murray, 1875)
Arhopala rama (Kollar, [1844])
Artipe eryx okinawana (Matsumura, 1919)
Artopoetes pryeri pryeri (Murray, 1873)
Callophrys ferrea ferrea (Butler, 1866)
Catochrysops panormus exiguus (Distant, 1886)
Catochrysops strabo luzonensis Tite, 1959
Celastrina argiolus ladonides (de l'Orza, 1869)
Celastrina lavendularis himilcon (Fruhstorfer, 1909)
Celastrina ogasawaraensis (H. Pryer, 1883)
Celastrina sugitanii ainonica Murayama, 1952
Celastrina sugitanii kyushuensis Shirôzu, 1943
Celastrina sugitanii sugitanii (Matsumura, 1919)
Chrysozephyrus brillantinus (Staudinger, 1887)
Chrysozephyrus hisamatsusanus hisamatsusanus (Nagami & Ishiga, 1935)
Chrysozephyrus smaragdinus smaragdinus (Bremer, 1861)
Coreana raphaelis (Oberthür, 1880)
Curetis acuta paracuta de Nicéville, 1902
Deudorix epijarbas epijarbas (Moore, [1858])
Euchrysops cnejus (Fabricius, 1798)
Everes argiades argiades (Pallas, 1771)
Everes lacturnus kawaii Matsumura, 1926
Everes lacturnus lacturnus (Godart, [1824])
Famegana alsulus (Herrich-Schäffer, 1869)
Favonius cognatus latifasciatus Shirôzu & Hayashi, 1959
Favonius jezoensis (Matsumura, 1915)
Favonius orientalis (Murray, 1875)
Favonius saphirinus saphirinus (Staudinger, 1887)
Favonius taxila taxila (Bremer, 1861)
Favonius ultramarinus ultramarinus (Fixsen, 1887)
Favonius yuasai Shirôzu, 1947
Fixsenia iyonis iyonis (Ota & Kusunoki, 1957)
Fixsenia iyonis kibiensis (Shirôzu & M. Nanba, 1973)
Fixsenia iyonis surugaensis (Fujioka, 1981)
Fixsenia mera (Janson, 1877)
Fixsenia pruni jezoensis (Matsumura, 1919)
Fixsenia w-album fentoni (Butler, [1882])
Freyeria putli (Kollar, [1844])
Glaucopsyche lycormas lycormas (Butler, 1866)
Glaucopsyche lycormas tomariana (Matsumura, 1928)
Iratsume orsedice orsedice (Butler, [1882])
Jamides alecto dromicus (Fruhstorfer, 1910)
Jamides bochus formosanus Fruhstorfer, 1909
Japonica lutea lutea (Hewitson, [1865])
Japonica onoi mizobei Saigusa, 1993
Japonica onoi onoi Murayama, 1953
Japonica saepestriata gotohi Saigusa, 1993
Japonica saepestriata saepestriata (Hewitson, [1865])
Lampides boeticus (Linnaeus, 1767)
Leptotes plinius (Fabricius, 1793)
Luthrodes mindora (C. Felder & R. Felder, 1865)
Luthrodes pandava (Horsfield, [1829])
Lycaena phlaeas chinensis (C. Felder, 1862)
Megisba malaya sikkima Moore, 1884
Nacaduba kurava septentrionalis Shirôzu, 1953
Neopithecops zalmora (Butler, [1870])
Neozephyrus japonicus japonicus (Murray, 1875)
Niphanda fusca fusca (Bremer & Grey, 1852)
Nothodanis schaeffera schaeffera (Eschscholtz, 1821)
Petrelaea tombugensis tombugensis (Röber, 1886)
Phengaris arionides takamukui (Matsumura, 1919)
Phengaris teleius daisensis (Matsumura, 1926)
Phengaris teleius hosonoi (A. Takahashi, 1973)
Phengaris teleius kazamoto (H. Druce, 1875)
Phengaris teleius ogumae (Matsumura, 1910)
Pithecops corvus ryukyuensis Shiôzu, 1964
Pithecops fulgens tsushimanus Shirôzu & Urata, 1957
Plebejus argus micrargus (Butler, 1878)
Plebejus argus pseudaegon (Butler, [1882])
Plebejus argyrognomon praeterinsularis Verity, 1921
Plebejus subsolanus iburiensis (Butler, [1882])
Plebejus subsolanus yaginus (Strand, 1922)
Plebejus subsolanus yarigadakeanus (Matsumura, 1929)
Prosotas nora formosana (Fruhstorfer, 1916)
Pseudozizeeria maha argia (Ménétriès, 1857)
Pseudozizeeria maha okinawana (Matsumura, 1929)
Rapala arata (Bremer, 1861)
Scolitantides orion jezoensis (Matsumura, 1919)
Shijimia moorei moorei (Leech, 1889)
Shijimiaeoides divina asonis (Matsumura, 1929)
Shijimiaeoides divina barine (Leech, 1893)
Shirozua jonasi jonasi (Janson, 1877)
Sibataniozephyrus fujisanus fujisanus (Matsumura, 1910)
Spalgis epeus dilama (Moore, 1878)
Spindasis takanonis takanonis (Matsumura, 1906)
Taraka hamada hamada (H. Druce, 1875)
Thermozephyrus ataxus kirishimaensis (Okajima, 1922)
Thermozephyrus ataxus yakushimaensis (Yazaki, [1924])
Tongeia fischeri japonica Fujioka, 1975
Tongeia fischeri shirozui Hida, 2005
Tongeia fischeri shojii Satonaka, 2003
Udara albocaerulea albocaerulea (Moore, 1879)
Udara dilecta dilecta (Moore, 1879)
Ussuriana stygiana (Butler, 1881)
Wagimo signatus (Butler, [1882])
Zizeeria karsandra (Moore, 1865)
Zizina emelina emelina (de l'Orza, 1869)
Zizina otis riukuensis (Matsumura, 1929)
Zizula hylax (Fabricius, 1775)

Nymphalidae
Aglais io geisha (Stichel, 1908)
Aglais urticae connexa (Butler, [1882])
Aglais urticae esakii Kurosawa & Fujioka, 1975
Aglais urticae urticae (Linnaeus, 1758)
Apatura metis substituta Butler, 1873
Araschnia burejana burejana Bremer, 1861
Araschnia levana obscura Fenton, [1882]
Argynnis anadyomene ella Bremer, [1865]
Argynnis childreni childreni Gray, 1831
Argynnis hyperbius hyperbius (Linnaeus, 1763)
Argynnis laodice japonica Ménétriès, 1857
Argynnis paphia tsushimana Fruhstorfer, 1906
Argynnis ruslana Motschulsky, 1866
Argynnis sagana liane Fruhstorfer, 1907
Ariadne ariadne pallidior (Fruhstorfer, 1899)
Athyma fortuna kodahirai (Sonan, 1938)
Athyma perius perius (Linnaeus, 1758)
Athyma selenophora ishiana Fruhstorfer, 1899
Boloria freija asahidakeana (Matsumura, 1926)
Boloria iphigenia (Graeser, 1888)
Boloria thore jezoensis (Matsumura, 1919)
Brenthis daphne iwatensis (M. Okano, 1951)
Brenthis daphne rabdia (Butler, 1877)
Brenthis ino mashuensis (Kono, 1931)
Brenthis ino tigroides (Fruhstorfer, 1907)
Calinaga buddha formosana Fruhstorfer, 1908
Cirrochroa tyche C. Felder & R. Felder, 1861
Coenonympha hero latifasciata Matsumura, 1925
Coenonympha hero neoperseis Fruhstorfer, 1908
Coenonympha oedippus annulifer Butler, 1877
Coenonympha oedippus arothius Okada & Torii, 1945
Cupha erymanthis erymanthis (Drury, [1773])
Cyrestis thyodamas mabella Fruhstorfer, 1898
Danaus chrysippus chrysippus (Linnaeus, 1758)
Danaus genutia genutia (Cramer, [1779])
Danaus melanippus edmondii (Lesson, 1837)
Danaus plexippus plexippus (Linnaeus, 1758)
Dichorragia nesimachus ishigakiana Shirôzu, 1952
Dichorragia nesimachus nesiotes Fruhstorfer, 1903
Dichorragia nesimachus okinawaensis Shimagami, 1986
Doleschallia bistaltide philippensis Fruhstorfer, 1899
Elymnias hypermnestra hainana Moore, 1878
Erebia ligea rishirizana Matsumura, 1928
Erebia ligea takanonis Matsumura, 1909
Erebia niphonica Janson, 1877
Euploea camaralzeman cratis Butler, 1866
Euploea core godartii Lucas, 1853
Euploea eunice eunice (Godart, 1819)
Euploea eunice hobsoni (Butler, [1878])
Euploea klugii erichsonii C. Felder & R. Felder, [1865]
Euploea midamus midamus (Linnaeus, 1758)
Euploea mulciber barsine Fruhstorfer, 1904
Euploea radamanthus radamanthus (Fabricius, 1793)
Euploea swainson swainson (Godart, [1824])
Euploea sylvester laetifica Butler, 1866
Euploea tulliolus koxinga Fruhstorfer, 1908
Euploea tulliolus polita Erichson, 1834
Fabriciana adippe pallescens (Butler, 1873)
Fabriciana nerippe (C. Felder & R. Felder, 1862)
Hestina assimilis assimilis (Linnaeus, 1758)
Hestina assimilis shirakii Shirôzu, 1955
Hestina japonica (C. Felder & R. Felder, 1862)
Hestina persimilis tsushimana Fujioka, 1981
Hypolimnas anomala anomala (Wallace, 1869)
Hypolimnas bolina bolina (Linnaeus, 1758)
Hypolimnas bolina jacintha (Drury, 1773)
Hypolimnas bolina kezia (Butler, [1878])
Hypolimnas bolina philippensis (Butler, 1874)
Hypolimnas bolina rarik (Eschscholtz, 1821)
Hypolimnas misippus (Linnaeus, 1764)
Idea leuconoe clara (Butler, 1867)
Idea leuconoe riukiuensis (Holland, 1893)
Ideopsis juventa manillana (Moore, 1883)
Ideopsis similis similis (Linnaeus, 1758)
Junonia almana almana (Linnaeus, 1758)
Junonia atlites atlites (Linnaeus, 1763)
Junonia hedonia ida (Cramer, 1775)
Junonia hierta (Fabricius, 1798)
Junonia iphita iphita (Cramer, [1779])
Junonia lemonias lemonias (Linnaeus, 1758)
Junonia orithya orithya (Linnaeus, 1758)
Kallima inachus eucerca Fruhstorfer, 1898
Kaniska canace ishima (Fruhstorfer, [1899])
Kaniska canace nojaponicum (von Siebold, 1824)
Kirinia fentoni (Butler, 1877)
Lasiommata deidamia deidamia (Eversmann, 1851)
Lasiommata deidamia interrupta (Fruhstorfer, 1909)
Lasiommata deidamia kampuzana Y. Yazaki, 1981
Lethe diana diana (Butler, 1866)
Lethe diana mikuraensis Shirôzu, 1975
Lethe europa pavida Fruhstorfer, 1908
Lethe marginalis (Motschulsky, [1861])
Lethe sicelis (Hewitson, [1862])
Libythea geoffroy philippina Staudinger, 1889
Libythea lepita amamiana Shirôzu, 1956
Libythea lepita celtoides Fruhstorfer, [1909]
Libythea lepita formosana Fruhstorfer, 1908
Libythea narina luzonica Moore, [1901]
Limenitis camilla japonica Ménétriès, 1857
Limenitis glorifica Fruhstorfer, 1909
Limenitis populi jezoensis Matsumura, 1919
Lopinga achine achinoides (Butler, 1878)
Lopinga achine jezoensis (Matsumura, 1919)
Lopinga achine oniwakiensis Y. Yazaki & Hiramoto, 1981
Melanargia epimede Staudinger, 1892
Melanitis boisduvalia boisduvalia (C. Felder & R. Felder, 1863)
Melanitis leda leda (Linnaeus, 1758)
Melanitis phedima oitensis Matsumura, 1919
Melitaea ambigua niphona (Butler, 1878)
Melitaea protomedia Ménétriès, 1858
Melitaea scotosia Butler, 1878
Minois dryas bipunctata (Motschulsky, 1860)
Mycalesis francisca perdiccas Hewitson, [1862]
Mycalesis gotama fulginia Fruhstorfer, [1911]
Mycalesis madjicosa amamiana Fujioka, 1975
Mycalesis madjicosa madjicosa Butler, 1868
Mycalesis perseus (Fabricius, 1775)
Neope goschkevitschii (Ménétriès, 1857)
Neope niphonica kiyosumiensis M. Takáhashi & Aoyama, 1981
Neope niphonica marumoi Esaki & Umeno, 1929
Neope niphonica niphonica Butler, 1881
Neptis alwina (Bremer & Grey, 1852)
Neptis hylas luculenta Fruhstorfer, 1907
Neptis philyra philyra Ménétriès, 1858
Neptis pryeri hamadai Fujioka, Minotani & Fukuda, 1999
Neptis pryeri iwasei Fujioka, 1998
Neptis pryeri kitakamiensis Fukuda, Minotani & Iwano, 2000
Neptis pryeri yodoei Fujioka, 1998
Neptis rivularis bergmanni Bryk, 1942
Neptis rivularis insularum Fruhstorfer, 1907
Neptis rivularis shirozui M. Okano, 1954
Neptis rivularis tadamiensis Higuma, 1961
Neptis sappho intermedia W. B. Pryer, 1877
Neptis sappho yessonensis Fruhstorfer, [1913]
Ninguta schrenckii schrenckii (Ménétriès, 1858)
Nymphalis antiopa (Linnaeus, 1758)
Nymphalis vaualbum ([Denis & Schiffermüller], 1775)
Nymphalis xanthomelas japonica (Stichel, 1902)
Oeneis melissa daisetsuzana Matsumura, 1926
Oeneis norna asamana Matsumura, 1919
Oeneis norna sugitanii Shirôzu, 1952
Parantica aglea maghaba (Fruhstorfer, 1909)
Parantica luzonensis luzonensis (C. Felder & R. Felder, 1863)
Parantica sita niphonica (Moore, 1883)
Parantica swinhoei (Moore, 1883)
Parantica vitrina vitrina (C. Felder & R. Felder, 1861)
Parthenos sylla philippensis Fruhstorfer, 1898
Phalanta alcippe (Stoll, [1782])
Phalanta phalantha (Drury, [1773])
Polygonia c-album hamigera (Butler, 1877)
Polygonia c-aureum c-aureum (Linnaeus, 1758)
Polyura eudamippus weismanni (Fritze, 1894)
Polyura narcaea (Hewitson, [1854])
Sasakia charonda charonda (Hewitson, [1863])
Speyeria aglaja basalis (Matsumura, 1908)
Speyeria aglaja fortuna (Janson, 1877)
Symbrenthia lilaea lunica M.J. Bascombe, Johnston & F.S. Bascombe, 1999
Tirumala hamata orientalis (Semper, 1879)
Tirumala ishmoides sontinus (Fruhstorfer, 1911)
Tirumala limniace limniace (Cramer, [1775])
Tirumala limniace orestilla (Fruhstorfer, [1910])
Tirumala septentrionis septentrionis (Butler, 1874)
Vanessa cardui (Linnaeus, 1758)
Vanessa indica indica (Herbst, 1794)
Yoma sabina podium Tsukada, 1985
Ypthima argus argus Butler, 1866
Ypthima masakii Ito, 1947
Ypthima multistriata ganus Fruhstorfer, [1911]
Ypthima multistriata niphonica Murayama, 1969
Ypthima riukiuana Matsumura, 1906
Ypthima yayeyamana Nire, 1920
Zophoessa callipteris (Butler, 1877)

See also
 List of moths of Japan
 Wildlife Protection Areas in Japan
 List of national parks of Japan

References

Important literature
Adalbert Seitz Die Gross-Schmetterlinge der Erde  Abt. 1,  Die Großschmetterlinge des palaearktischen Faunengebietes, Die palaearktischen Tagfalter, 1909, 379 Seiten, mit 89 kolorierten Tafeln (3470 Figuren) online text,  online plates
Fujioka, T., 1975. Butterflies of Japan [1]. 312pp., 137 pls.. Kôdansha, Tokyo (in Japanese)
John Henry Leech, 1892-1893. Butterflies from China, Japan and Corea 1: 54 + 297 pp.; 2: 297-681, 1 map; 43 pls. London.
Yokoyama, M. & Wakabayashi, M., 1970. Coloured Illustrations of the Butterflies of Japan Hoikusha Publishing Co. Ltd, Osaka.178pp, 74 pls
Kawazoé, A. & Wakabayashi, M., 1979. Coloured Illustrations of the Butterflies of Japan. Edn. 2. Osaka, Hoikusha: vii+422 pp, 72 pls, 80 figs.
Shonen Matsumura,1904- Nihon senchu zukai or Thousand insects of Japan Tokyo :[Keiseisha?], Meiji 37-40 [1904-1907] online (four volumes)
Bernard d'Abrera, 1991-1993 Butterflies of the Holarctic Region, 3 Parts (pt. 1. Papilionidae, Pieridae, Danaidae & Satyridae (partim) -pt. 2. Satyridae (concl.) & Nymphalidae (partim) -pt. 3. Nymphalidae (concl.), Libytheidae, Riodinidae & Lycaenidae., Hill House, Victoria  
P. A. Ler Ed. 2001 Key to the insects of the Far East of Russia, Vol. 5, Part 3: Trichoptera and Lepidoptera Dal'nauka, Vladivostok 
Shibatani, A. and S. Ito, 1942. Beitrag zur systematik der Theclinae im kaiserreich Japan unter besonderer berucksichtigung der sogenannten gattung Zephyrus (Lepidoptera: Lycaenidae). Nature Life (Kyungpook J. bio. Sci.) 15: 33-46, figs.
Pryer, H. J. S., 1886. Rhopalocera Nihonica: a description of the butterflies of Japan, Ed. 1: 12 pp, 3 pls; Ed 2: xiii +35pp, 10pls
Igarashi, S. and H. Fukuda. 1997- . The life histories of Asian butterflies Tokai University Press, Tokyo.
S Ishikawa, 1994 Cho (Butterflies) Living in Japan Maruzen Company Ltd 
Motomu Teshirogi, 1997 An Illustrated Book of the Japanese Nymphalidae Tōkyō: Tōkai Daigaku Shuppankai (Tokyo University Press) 
Motomu Teshirogi, 1997 An Illustrated Book of the Japanese Lycaenidae Tōkyō: Tōkai Daigaku Shuppankai. 
 Toshio Inomata Ed. Colour photographs by Katsuji Iwao. 1986.Atlas of the Japanese Butterflies Take Shobo Co. Ltd., 7-3, lidabashi 2, Chiyoda, Tokyo, 102 Japan.500 pp., numerous text figs., 86 color plates. 
Taro Iwase, 1954 Synopsis of the known life-histories of Japanese butterflies The Lepidopterists' News 1954: 95-100 pdf

Papers by Shonen Matsumura, Alfred Ernest Wileman, Atuhiro Sibatani, Siuiti Murayama, Takashi Shirôzu, Richard Paget Murray, Oliver Erichson Janson in Tyô to Ga Series website (open access)

History
Wilhem de Haan 1833- with Japanese artist naturalists Keiga Kawahara Kurimoto Masayoshi and others.Fauna Japonica sive Descriptio animalium, quae in itinere per Japoniam, jussu et auspiciis superiorum, qui summum in India Batava imperium tenent, suscepto, annis 1825 - 1830 collegit, notis, observationibus et adumbrationibus illustravit Ph. Fr. de Siebold. Conjunctis studiis C. J. Temminck et H. Schlegel pro vertebratis atque W. de Haan pro invertebratis elaborata (Fauna Japonica in five serial volumes published between 1833 and 1850)
Henry John Elwes, 1881 On the Butterflies of Amurland, North China, and Japan Proceedings of the Zoological Society of London 1881: 856-917
Ueno, M., 1987. A history of Japanese Zoology (in Japanese). 531pp. Yasakashobo, Tokyo.

External links

Database MOKUROKU Based on Y. Hirashima, 1989 & 1990 Entomological Laboratory, Faculty of Agriculture, Kyushu University and Japan Wild Life Research Center (eds.), 1989, A Check List of Japanese Insects. 1,767 pp, Fukuoka. (In Japanese)
Osaka Prefecture University Harmony Museum Lepidoptera collection images including types (under Scientific materials)
 Butterflies of Asia -Japan
Konchu Dictionary of Japanese insect names
Kyoichiro Ueda, Yoshihisa Sawada, Yutaka Yoshiyasu and Toshiya Hirowatari, 2000 A list ofJapanese Insect Collection by P. F. von Siebold and H. Burger preserved in Nationaal Natuurhistorisch Museum, Leiden, the Netherlands Bull. Kitakyushu Mus. Nat. Hist., 19: 43-75, pls. 5. March 31, 2000 online pdf

Japan
Japan
Butterflies of Japan
Butterflies